Goutam Deb (born 6 January 1957) is an Indian Politician currently serving as the Mayor  of Siliguri Municipal Corporation. He was a Cabinet Minister of Department of Tourism in the Government of West Bengal from 2016 to 2021. He also served as the Minister of North Bengal Development, a newly formed department in 2011 by Mamata Banerjee, the first woman Chief Minister of West Bengal. He was a Member of Legislative Assembly from Dabgram-Phulbari Assembly Constituency two times. Presently he is serving as Mayor of Siliguri Municipal Corporation.

Early life and education

Goutam Deb did his schooling from Siliguri Boys' High School and thereafter he graduated from Siliguri College  under the University of North Bengal with B.A. followed by LL.B. Degree from Surendranath Law College under University of Calcutta.

He enrolled as an Advocate at the Siliguri Bar in 1982. His father, Late Tejendra Binod Deb, was also a lawyer.

His elder brother, Late Anup Deb  was Acting Chief Justice of Hon’ble High Court of Sikkim.

Personal life
His wife is a social worker and elected as Councillor from Ward No. 17, Siliguri Municipal Corporation.

His son Saswata Deb studied in St. Xavier's Collegiate School. He is currently pursuing Computer Science and Engineering from VIT Bhopal. His daughter Dr. Sreya Deb obtained her M.B.B.S. degree from Calcutta National Medical College and Hospital and is currently pursuing her MD degree from St. John’s Medical College, Bangalore.

Political career
 1975 - He entered politics as a member of Chhatra Parishad (CP) of Darjeeling District.
  	1978 – He was directly elected General Secretary of Chhatra Parishad at Siliguri College in North Bengal. 
  	1978 to 1986 – He was the President of Chhatra Parishad of Darjeeling District.
  	From 1988 up to 2015, four times, he remained Councillor of Siliguri Municipal Corporation (formerly Siliguri Municipality) except from 2004 to 2009 (when the seat was reserved)
  	He was President of Youth Congress of Darjeeling District.
  	He remained Leader of Opposition of Siliguri Municipal Corporation 2 times.
  	Joined All India Trinamool Congress in 1998 (AITC).
  	He has been working as President of Darjeeling District Trinamool Congress from 2004, both for plains and hills.
  	He acted as Chairman of Trinamool Congress Core Committee of North Bengal comprising 8 districts.
   Member, National Working Committee, All India Trinamool Congress.

Officials positions held

 Presently acting as Mayor , Siliguri Municipal Corporation.[Since 22-Feb-2022 till date]
 Chairman, Board of Administrators, Siliguri Municipal Corporation. [Since 7-May-2021 to 27-Dec-2021]
 Minister-in-Charge, Tourism Department (since 27-May-2016 to 2 May 2021). 
 Chairman, West Bengal Tourism Development Corporation Ltd. (since 21-March-2017 to 2019) 

 Minister-in-Charge, North Bengal Development Department (since 20-May-2011 till 19-May-2016) 
 Chairman, Siliguri Jalpaiguri Development Authority  (from 15/03/2013 to 04/03/2016)
 Chairman of North Bengal State Transport Corporation (from 23/04/2012 to 10/06/2015).
 Chairman of Cooch Behar Development Fund Committee.
 Chairman of I.C.D.S. for Darjeeling and Jalpaiguri Districts.
 Chairman of Dinabandhu Mancha Advisory Committee. (Since 24 Aug. 2011)
 Chairman of Rogi Kalyan Samity of North Bengal Medical College and Hospital, North Bengal Dental College, Siliguri District Hospital, Jalpaiguri District Hospital and Darjeeling District Hospital (Eden Hospital).
 Chairman of Uttarbanga Unnayan Parshad formed for monitoring and reviewing the progress of development of all 8 districts of North Bengal. (17-Feb-2017-25-05-2019)
 Chairperson of Selection Committee for contractual employees to be engaged under Department of Health & Family Welfare, Govt. of West Bengal in Darjeeling SMP area.
 Chairperson, Rural ASHA & Block ASHA Facilitator of Darjeeling SMP area.
 President of Managing Committee of Siliguri Boys' High School.
 President of Managing Committee of Siliguri Girls' High School.
 Chairman of Tea Advisory Council. (Since 25-May-2017 till 2019)
 Member, Tea Advisory Council (Since 2019 to 2021)
 Present Chairman of Rogi Kalyan Samity of North Bengal Medical College & Hospital.

References

External links

https://timesofindia.indiatimes.com/city/kolkata/west-bengal-cm-mamata-banerjee-wants-a-siliguri-civic-cell-to-carry-out-development-work/articleshow/89607627.cms
http://gautamdeb.org/
https://www.facebook.com/minister.gautamdeb/
http://www.sikkimexpress.com/news-details/tmc-sweeps-siliguri-civic-polls-deb-announced-as-mayor

State cabinet ministers of West Bengal
Living people
West Bengal MLAs 2011–2016
West Bengal MLAs 2016–2021
1957 births
Trinamool Congress politicians from West Bengal